Turbinolia is a genus of corals belonging to the family Turbinoliidae.

The genus has almost cosmopolitan distribution.

Species

Species:

Turbinolia acuticostata 
Turbinolia arcotensis 
Turbinolia atalayensis

References

Turbinoliidae
Scleractinia genera